The 2016 Copa de España de Fútbol Sala is the 27th staging of the Copa de España de Fútbol Sala. It takes place in Guadalajara, Castilla-La Mancha from 10 – 13 March. The matches are played at Palacio Multiusos for up to 5,894 seats. The tournament is hosted by Castilla-La Mancha regional government, Guadalajara municipality & LNFS. Ciudad Real hosts Copa de España for first time.

Defending champions are Jaén Paraíso Interior, that caused a great upset last year when defeated seeded No.3, FC Barcelona in the Final could not defend the title due to failed to qualify to the tournament.

Movistar Inter won its ninth title after defeating ElPozo Murcia 2–1 in the Final.

Qualified teams
The qualified teams were the eight first teams on standings at midseason.

Venue

Matches

Quarter-finals

Semi-finals

Final

See also
2015–16 Primera División de Futsal
2015–16 Copa del Rey de Futsal

References

External links
Official website

Copa de España de Futsal seasons
Espana
Futsal